St. Wolstan's Priory is a former Augustinian (Victorine) monastery located in County Kildare, Ireland.

Location

History

The priory was founded in 1202 (or, according to William of Ware, 1205) by Adam de Hereford, one of the Anglo-Norman leaders of the Norman conquest of Ireland. It was founded for canons of the order of St Victor and was named after the recently canonised Saint Wulfstan (died 1095). The early buildings were nicknamed Scala Coeli, "stairs of heaven."

The monastery was granted the lands around Donaghcumper Church. In 1271 William de Mandesham, seneschal to Fulk Basset, Archbishop of Dublin, granted to the priory the lands of Tristildelane, modern Castledillon.

In 1308 a bridge across the River Liffey was built at his own expense by John Le Decer, Mayor of Dublin, next to the gate of St. Wolstan's. In 1314 the churches of Stacumney and Donaghmore were granted to the sole and separate use of the prior.

In 1536 the priory and lands were seized by King Henry VIII as part of the Dissolution of the Monasteries. It was the first monastery in Ireland to be suppressed and the last prior, Richard Weston, was granted a room in the monastery and supplied with food and fuel for the rest of his life. It was granted to John Alan, Lord Chancellor of Ireland, in 1538.

The buildings of the priory were probably converted into a house for Sir John Alan before his death in 1561. The Alen family lived at St. Wolstans for 216 years. They resided in the priory for much of this period and later built the house.

In 1782 the ruins were visited and sketched by Austin Cooper (1759–1830).

In 1955 the site was purchased by the Holy Faith Sisters, who established St. Wolstan's Holy Faith Convent School. The school has since moved site but retains the name of St Wolstan's Community School.

It was partially excavated in 2002 as part of an archeological assessment, but nothing of significance was found.

Remains
The remains consist of two gateways, a four-storey tower, and two fragments.

References

Augustinian monasteries in the Republic of Ireland
Religion in County Kildare
Archaeological sites in County Kildare
1200s establishments in Ireland
1202 establishments in Europe
Religious buildings and structures completed in 1202